Kalateh-ye Tir Kaman (also Romanized as Kalāteh-ye Tīr Kamān; also known as Kalāteh) is a village in Rob-e Shamat Rural District, Sheshtomad District, Sabzevar County, Razavi Khorasan Province, Iran. At the 2006 census, its population was 580, in 153 families.

References 

Populated places in Sabzevar County